Europium(III) acetate is an inorganic salt of europium and acetic acid with the chemical formula of Eu(CH3COO)3. In this compound, europium exhibits the +3 oxidation state. It can exist in the anhydrous form, sesquihydrate and tetrahydrate. Its hydrate molecule is a dimer.

Preparation 
Europium acetate can be obtained by stirring reaction of acetic acid and europium oxide under heating, and then diluting with water and crystallizing:

 Eu2O3 + 6 CH3COOH → 2 Eu(CH3COO)3 + 3 H2O

Europium can also directly participate in the reaction:

 2 Eu + 6 CH3COOH → 2 Eu(CH3COO)3 + 3 H2↑

Properties

Physical properties 

The anhydrous europium acetate crystallizes monoclinically in the space group C2/c (space group no. 15) with the lattice parameters a = 1126.0(3), b = 2900.5(6), c = 799.1( 2) pm and β = 132.03(2)° with four formula units per unit cell. The sesquihydrate crystallizes monoclinically in the space group Cc (No. 9) with the lattice parameters a = 1608.7(2), b = 1665.6(2), c = 839.1(1) pm and β = 115.75( 9)° with four formula units per unit cell. The heat capacity at 280 K is 803±16 J/(mol∙K).

Chemical properties 
Europium acetate can be dissolved in water, acidified with acetic acid, and the compound of divalent europium [Eu(CH3COO)2(CH3COOH)(H2O)2] can be obtained by electrochemical reduction.

Europium acetate can be crystallized in excess glacial acetic acid to give the salt [Eu(H(CH3COO)2)3](H2O).

Decomposition 
Europium acetate can be decomposed by heating, and the hydrate first loses water to obtain anhydrous, and then passes through basic acetate EuOCH3COO, basic carbonate Eu2O2CO3, and finally obtains europium oxide. The tetrahydrate of europium acetate decomposes in air over 6 stages to europium oxide.

Stage 1 at 135 °C:

Eu(CH3COO)3·4H2O → Eu(CH3COO)3·H2O + 3H2O

Stage 2 at 170 °C:

Eu(CH3COO)3·3H2O → Eu(CH3COO)3·0.5 H2O + 0.5 H2O

Stage 3 at 210 °C:

Eu(CH3COO)3·0.5H2O → Eu(CH3COO)3 + 0.5 H2O

Stage 4 at 310 °C:

Eu(CH3COO)3 → EuO(CH3COO) + C3H6O + CO2

Stage 5 at 390 °C:

2EuO(CH3COO) → Eu2O2[CO3] + C3H6O

Stage 6 at 670 °C:

Eu2O2[CO3] → Eu2O3 + CO2

Notes

References 

Acetates
Europium(III) compounds